Ononto Prem is a 1977 Bangladeshi film directed by Razzak and starring Razzak and Bobita. This was the first film directed by Razzak.

Controversies
The film became very controversial due to a two minute long kissing scene between Razzak and Bobita. It was the first kissing scene in Dhallywood and was almost unthinkable at that time. However, the scene was erased from the final cut.

Music
 "O Chokhe Chokh Poreche Jokhoni" - Sabina Yasmin and Khurshid Alam
"Alo Tumi Nibhe Jao" - Sabina Yasmin

Awards
3rd Bangladesh National Film Awards
Best Cinematographer (black and white) - Reza Latif

References

External links
 

1977 films
Bengali-language Bangladeshi films
1970s Bengali-language films
Films scored by Azad Rahman